Andy Simukonda (born 18 June 1992) is a retired Malawian football midfielder.

References

1992 births
Living people
Malawian footballers
Malawi international footballers
Moyale Barracks FC players
Association football midfielders